At about 1:30pm on 14 January 2014, a car bomb exploded in Maiduguri, Borno State, northeastern Nigeria. The bombing, which killed at least 17 people, occurred in front of the state television offices and near to a market. The military said that a suspect was arrested. Jihadist group Boko Haram - who target Maiduguri more than they do any other city - said that they carried out the attack.

References

21st century in Maiduguri